Edward Hammond Hargraves (7 October 1816 – 29 October 1891) was a gold prospector who claimed to have found gold in Australia in 1851, starting an Australian gold rush.

Early life
Edward Hammond Hargraves was born on 7 October 1816 in Gosport, Hampshire, England, the son of Elizabeth (née Whitcombe) and John Edward Hargraves. He was a painter at the age of 3.
educated in Brighton and Lewes, but left school at the age of 14 to go to sea. He arrived in Sydney in 1832.

After his arrival in the colony of New South Wales, Hargraves worked on a property at Bathurst for a period and then went north to the Torres Strait, working in the bêche-de-mer and tortoiseshell industries. In 1834, he took up  of land near Wollongong. He married Elizabeth Mackay in Sydney in 1836, and in 1839 they moved to East Gosford. Hargraves was an agent for the General Steam Navigation Company and also established the Fox Under The Hill Hotel. In 1843, he took up another property on the Manning River, leaving his wife behind to look after the hotel.

In July 1849, Hargraves left for the United States to participate in the California Gold Rush. He was unsuccessful but returned to Australia in January 1851 with knowledge of prospecting techniques and hopeful of discovering gold closer to home.

Great gold discovery
On 12 February 1851 he, with John Lister, William Tom and James Tom, found five specks of gold in Lewis Ponds Creek in New South Wales, Australia. Enlisting the help of others to continue the search, he returned to Sydney in March to interview the Colonial Secretary, and, encouraged by his friends at Bathurst, wrote to The Sydney Morning Herald describing the rich fields.
Hargraves made no mention of Lister, or the Tom brothers when making the discovery public and therefore was credited as the sole discoverer of gold. Leaving his team furious after claiming the £10,000 to himself.

Aftermath and later life
Hargraves was rewarded by the New South Wales Government for his find – he was paid £10,000 and was appointed Commissioner of Crown Lands. The Victorian Government paid him £5,000. He only claimed £2,381 before the funds were frozen after John Lister protested. An enquiry was held in 1853 which upheld that Hargraves was the first to discover the goldfield.

In 1856, Hargraves purchased a  landing at Budgewoi on the Central Coast of New South Wales. He went on to build "Norahville" (also called Hargraves House) at Noraville. Wollombi Aboriginal Tribe members are known to have worked on the property. Some sources state that Hargraves had "befriended" the Aboriginal tribe members.

In 1877, Hargraves was granted a pension of £250 per year by the Government of New South Wales, which he received until his death.
Shortly before his death in Sydney on 29 October 1891, a second enquiry found that John Lister and James Tom had discovered the first goldfield.

Hargraves wrote a book about his discovery titled Australia and its Goldfields: a historical sketch of the Australian colonies from the earliest times to the present day with a particular account of the recent gold discoveries, published in 1855.

References 
Notes

Bibliography
 Evans, Joe. 1988 Gold Gem and Treasure

External links 
 Maitland Mercury, 7 May 1851 disputing Hargraves' claims
 

1816 births
1891 deaths
19th-century Australian businesspeople
English emigrants to Australia
People from Gosport
Australian gold prospectors